BNS may stand for:
Baltic News Service
Bandai Namco Studios
Bangladesh Navy Ship prefix
Barnes railway station, England, station code
Bathiya and Santhush, Sri Lankan hip hop duo
Beijing National Stadium
Best Node Search algorithm
British Neuropathological Society
British Numismatic Society, founded in 1903
British Nylon Spinners (1940–1964), a company licensed to produce Nylon yarn
Blocul National Sindical, the National Trade Union Bloc, Romania
Boustead Naval Shipyard
Scotiabank, formerly "Bank of Nova Scotia", stock ticker